The 2013–2014 season was AFC Wimbledon's twelfth season since formation in 2002 and the club's third consecutive season in Football League Two.

League table

Results summary

Match results

Pre-season Friendlies

League Two 2013–14

August

September

October

November

December

January

February

March

April

May

FA Cup 2013–14

Football League Cup 2013–14

Football League Trophy 2013–14

Player statistics

Appearances and goals

|-
|colspan="14"|Players who featured on loan for AFC Wimbledon but subsequently returned to their parent club:

|-
|colspan="14"|Players who were released by the club at the end of the season:

|}

Top scorers

Disciplinary record

Transfers

References

AFC Wimbledon seasons
AFC Wimbledon
AFC Wimbledon season
AFC Wimbledon season